Atherstone Nature Reserve, also known as the Atherstone Collaborative Nature Reserve, is a 23,500 hectare reserve situated close to Dwaalboom, in the Limpopo, province in South Africa. The reserve consists mainly of vast savannah plains with bushveld and Kalahari grasslands ecosystems. Besides antelopes, zebras and giraffes, the black rhino and elephants are one of the highlights of Atherstone.

History 

Norman Edward Atherstone, who was originally a cattle farmer and become the first game farmer In this area, did a lot to re-introduce some game on his farmland, which was then called the Atherstone Game Reserve. He never had a wife nor children and, in his last will, he donated his farms to the former Transvaal Nature Conservation Department. In 1990 the Atherstone Nature Reserve was founded; it became the Atherstone Collaborative Nature Reserve in 1994, after some private farms were also incorporated into the reserve.

Animals 

The following list of animals were taken from pamphlet of the nature reserve.

Common animal species found in the reserve: 

Common bird species found in the reserve:

See also 
 Protected areas of South Africa
 Limpopo Tourism and Parks Board

References

Further reading

External links 
 Limpopo Tourism & Parks

Nature reserves in South Africa